South Dakota Highway 10 (SD 10) is a  state highway in the north-central and northeastern portions of South Dakota, United States. It connects SD 1804 in Pollock with the Minnesota state line southeast of Sisseton.

SD 10 was formerly the "Glacier Trail", and used to be designated as South Dakota Highway 12 (SD 12).

Route description

Campbell County
SD 10 begins at an intersection with SD 1804 in the south-central part of Pollock. It travels to the east on Main Street. After leaving the city limits of Pollock, the highway curves to the northeast and crosses over part of Lake Pocasse. It passes the Pocassee National Wildlife Refuge and curves to the east-southeast. It then heads nearly due east to an intersection with U.S. Route 83 (US 83) north of Herreid. The two highways travel concurrently to the south. They pass the Herreid Livestock Market and the Herreid Municipal Airport and then enters the city limits of Herreid. South of the city, they cross over Spring Creek. They travel just to the west of McClarem Lake and then intersect 112th Street. At this intersection, SD 10 splits off to the east. After an intersection with SD 271 (319th Avenue), the highway enters the west-central part of McPherson County.

McPherson County
SD 10 travels just north of some sewage disposal ponds and just south of Eureka Lake and then has an intersection with SD 47 and the southern terminus of County Road 3 (CR 3; both are parts of 327th Avenue). At this intersection, SD 10 and SD 47 travel concurrently and they enter Eureka. The highways travel just south of an eastern part of Eureka Lake. An intersection with 7th Street leads to the business district of the city. At 328th Avenue, SD 47 splits off to the north, and SD 10 continues to the east. It travels just south of the Rosenthal, Neuharth, Pfeiffle, Morlocks Slough, Odessa Number 2, and Odessa Number 1 state public shooting areas. Then, it has an intersection with SD 45 and the northern terminus of SD 247 (both parts of 341st Avenue). Here, SD 10 and SD 45 travel concurrently to the east. They skirt along the northern edge of the Highway 10 State Public Shooting Area. They travel north of the Moscow State Public Shooting Area and then curve to the southeast. They intersect the southern terminus of SD 239 (350th Avenue). SD 10 and SD 45 curve back to the east. Approximately  later, they enter Leola. SD 45 splits off to the south onto Mason Street. This intersection is also the southern terminus of CR 19 (363rd Avenue). SD 10 continues to the east and, at an intersection with 373rd Avenue, enters the northwestern part of Brown County.

Brown County
SD 10 travels just north of Willow Creek Lake and crosses over Elm River before it intersects US 281 (386th Avenue) southwest of Barnard. The two highways travel concurrently to the north, while the roadway continues as 115th Street. At an intersection with 112th Street, SD 10 splits off to the east. It passes the Sand Lake National Wildlife Refuge and crosses over Sand Lake before traveling through Houghton. The highway curves to the north onto 403rd Avenue and then back to the east onto 110th Street. At 404th Avenue, it intersects SD 37. SD 10 continues its eastward path. At an intersection with the southern terminus of 412th Avenue, the highway enters the west-central part of Marshall County.

Marshall County
SD 10 travels through West Britton before entering Britton. At Main Street, SD 27 begins a concurrency with SD 10. They cross over some railroad tracks of BNSF Railway. At an intersection with the northern terminus of 429th Avenue, SD 27 splits to the north. Then, SD 10 curves to the southeast and then travels through an area that has a lot of lakes. It travels just south of Sixmile Lake and then just south of Cottonwood Lake. Just south-southeast of the appropriately-named Lake City, the highway begins a concurrency with SD 25. This concurrency is just under . SD 10 continues to the southeast, just northeast of Clear Lake. It then slips between North Red Iron Lake and South Red Iron Lake. The highway curves back to the east and enters the northwestern part of Roberts County.

Roberts County

SD 10 continues in a relatively eastward direction and enters Sisseton. It travels just north of the Coteau des Prairies Hospital and then crosses over some railroad tracks of BNSF Railway. Just before leaving the city limits of Sisseton, SD 10 meets the southern terminus of SD 127 (459th Avenue). The highway travels just south of the Sisseton Municipal Airport just before an interchange with I-29/US 81. It then crosses over the Little Minnesota River. After a curve to the south and then to the southeast, it reaches its eastern terminus at the Minnesota state line. Here, the roadway continues as Minnesota State Highway 28 (MN 28).

History

SD 10 was formerly the "Glacier Trail". It was also formerly known as South Dakota Highway 12. The highway was redesignated in 1927, presumably to avoid confusion with nearby US 12.

The segment of the highway west of US 83 was added in the early 1960s.

Major intersections

See also

 List of state highways in South Dakota

References

External links

 The Unofficial South Dakota Highways Page: Highways 1-30

0010
Transportation in Campbell County, South Dakota
Transportation in McPherson County, South Dakota
Transportation in Brown County, South Dakota
Transportation in Marshall County, South Dakota
Transportation in Roberts County, South Dakota